Fu Mingtian (born 27 June 1990) is a Chinese-born Singaporean badminton player.

Early life 
Fu came to Singapore in 2003 and became a Singapore citizen in 2007 under the Foreign Sports Talent Scheme.

Career 
Fu became the first female Singaporean player to win the Southeast Asian Games women's singles badminton gold medal in 2011 Southeast Asian Games in Indonesia. She beat second-seed Ratchanok Intanon of Thailand 21–12, 21–18 en route to the final match. In the finals, she beat home favourite Adriyanti Firdasari 14–21, 21–12, 22–20. Despite Fu's achievements, she was not selected for the 2012 Summer Olympics and Gu Juan was selected.

After retirement from competitive badminton, Fu became a coach with the Singapore Badminton Association. She resigned from her coach position in 2017.

Personal life 
In 2017, Fu returned to China to marry another former Chinese shuttler who played for the Xiamen team. She expects to settle down in Xuzhou city, Jiangsu where her fiancé is from.

Awards 
Fu was awarded the Singapore's Sportswoman of the Year award in 2012.

Achievements

Southeast Asian Games 
Women's singles

BWF World Junior Championships 
Girls' doubles

Asian Junior Championships 
Girls' singles

Girls' doubles

BWF Grand Prix 
The BWF Grand Prix had two levels, the Grand Prix and Grand Prix Gold. It was a series of badminton tournaments sanctioned by the Badminton World Federation (BWF) and played between 2007 and 2017.

Women's singles

  BWF Grand Prix Gold tournament
  BWF Grand Prix tournament

BWF International Challenge/Series 
Women's singles

Women's doubles

  BWF International Challenge tournament
  BWF International Series tournament

References

External links 
 

1990 births
Living people
Badminton players from Wuhan
Chinese female badminton players
Chinese emigrants to Singapore
Singaporean female badminton players
Badminton players at the 2010 Commonwealth Games
Badminton players at the 2014 Commonwealth Games
Commonwealth Games bronze medallists for Singapore
Commonwealth Games medallists in badminton
Competitors at the 2007 Southeast Asian Games
Competitors at the 2009 Southeast Asian Games
Competitors at the 2011 Southeast Asian Games
Competitors at the 2013 Southeast Asian Games
Southeast Asian Games gold medalists for Singapore
Southeast Asian Games silver medalists for Singapore
Southeast Asian Games bronze medalists for Singapore
Southeast Asian Games medalists in badminton
Medallists at the 2014 Commonwealth Games